Karan Mahara (born 12 July 1972) is an Indian politician from Uttarakhand and a former two term member of the Uttarakhand Legislative Assembly. 

He was appointed Uttarakhand Pradesh Congress President on 10 April, 2022.

References

Living people
20th-century Indian politicians
Indian National Congress politicians from Uttarakhand
People from Pithoragarh district
Uttarakhand MLAs 2017–2022
Uttarakhand MLAs 2007–2012
1972 births